Joseph Benson Johnson (September 28, 1837March 29, 1913) was an American farmer and Republican politician.  He was a member of the Wisconsin State Assembly, representing Grant County during the 1893 session.

Biography
Joseph B. Johnson was born in Oakland County, Michigan, in September 1837.  He was educated in the common schools in Oakland County and Detroit, and came to Wisconsin in 1855.  He settled on a farm in the town of Highland, in Iowa County, Wisconsin, and resided there for over 25 years and was elected to the Iowa County Board of Supervisors from 1875 through 1879.

In 1880 he moved to the neighboring community of Montfort, Wisconsin, in Grant County, and served on the Grant County Board of Supervisors in 1881, 1882, 1885, 1887, and 1889.  He was elected to the Wisconsin State Assembly in 1892, running on the Republican Party ticket.  He represented Grant County's 2nd Assembly district, which then comprised the northern half of the county.  Johnson sought re-nomination for another term in the Assembly in 1894, but the Republican delegates instead selected Joshua B. Bradbury, who went on to win the election.

Johnson did, however, receive a consolation from the Republican caucus.  After leaving office at the end of the 41st Wisconsin Legislature, he was hired as assistant sergeant-at-arms for the State Assembly in the 42nd Wisconsin Legislature.

After leaving the Legislature, he served three non-consecutive terms as village president of Montfort.  He died of a sudden heart failure in his sleep at his home in Montfort on March 29, 1913.

Personal life and family
Joseph B. Johnson married Martha Comfort in 1862. They had at least five children, four of which survived them.

References

External links
 

1837 births
1913 deaths
People from Royal Oak, Michigan
People from Iowa County, Wisconsin
People from Montfort, Wisconsin
Republican Party members of the Wisconsin State Assembly
Mayors of places in Wisconsin
County officials in Wisconsin
Wisconsin pioneers
Farmers from Wisconsin
19th-century American politicians